The Voice UK is a British television music competition to find new singing talent. The tenth series premiered on 2 January 2021, on ITV. will.i.am, Sir Tom Jones and Olly Murs returned as coaches for their tenth, ninth and fourth series, respectively. Singer Anne-Marie joined the coaching panel, replacing exiting coach Meghan Trainor. Meanwhile, Emma Willis returned for her eighth series as host.

Filming of the auditions took place in late 2020 at the Dock10 Studios, where COVID-19 safety protocols were introduced; such as the coaches' chairs being socially distanced, a virtual audience and the band wearing PPE. Filming of the Battles and Semi-Finals took place in January and February 2021.

On 20 March 2021, Craig Eddie was announced the winner of the season, marking Anne-Marie's first win as a coach and the second female coach to win in the show's history, following Jennifer Hudson. She is also the second new coach to win on her first attempt, following Jennifer Hudson.

Coaches 

On 12 October 2020, it was announced will.i.am, Sir Tom Jones and Olly Murs would return to the show as coaches for their tenth, ninth and fourth series, respectively. They are joined by a new coach, singer-songwriter Anne-Marie, who replaces former coach Meghan Trainor, who did not return for her second series due to her pregnancy as well as travel restrictions imposed by the COVID-19 pandemic.

Production 
On 10 December 2020, ITV announced the tenth series of The Voice UK would premiere on 2 January 2021.

ITV also announced the blocked feature would be coming to the blind auditions, which allows for a coach to prevent another coach from getting an artist. Each coach will only receive one block.

Teams 
Colour key

  Winner
  Runner-up
  Third place
  Fourth place
  Eliminated by the public vote
  Eliminated in the Semi-Finals
  Artist was stolen by another coach at the Battles
  Eliminated in the Battles
  Withdrew

Blind Auditions

Episode 1 (2 January)

Episode 2 (9 January)

Episode 3 (16 January)

Episode 4 (23 January)

Episode 5 (30 January)

Episode 6 (6 February)

Episode 7 (13 February)

Battle rounds

Episode 1 (20 February)

Episode 2 (27 February) 

 Although Janel Antoneshia won the battle, she later withdrew from the show for personal reasons. Will selected Okujala, who Janel had defeated in the battle rounds, to take her place for the semi final.
 Although Wura won the battle, she later withdrew from the show for personal reasons. Jones selected Jake O'Neill, who Wura had defeated in the battle rounds, to take her place for the semi final.

Show details

Results summary
Colour key

  Team Will
  Team Anne-Marie
  Team Tom
  Team Olly
  Artist received the most public votes
  Artist was eliminated

Week 1: Semi-final 1 (6 March)

Week 2: Semi-final 2 (13 March)

Public vote

Week 3: Final (20 March)
Musical guest: Blessing Chitapa ("I Smile")

References

External links
 Official website

Series 10
2021 British television seasons